Doco2 is a village in the 7ème section of Arcahaie commune in the Arcahaie Arrondissement, in the Ouest.

See also
Arcahaie, for a list of other settlements in the commune.

References

Populated places in Ouest (department)